Glynn Wolfe (July 25, 1908 – June 10, 1997), also known as Scotty Wolfe, was an American Baptist minister who resided in Blythe, California. Wolfe is best known for having the largest number of monogamous marriages, having married 31 different times, although one of his marriages was annulled. His shortest marriage lasted 19 days, and his longest lasted eleven years. Three of his marriages were to women he had previously divorced: remarried Charlotte Devane in 1936, after divorcing earlier that year; remarried Katherine Archer in 1949 after divorcing the previous year; and Sharon Goodwin in 1960 after divorcing the previous year. Only five of his marriages ended with the death of a spouse, surviving his 1st, 8th, 9th and 23rd wife, before being survived by his 31st wife. His longest marriage was for 11 years, to his 28th wife, Christine Camacho, who was 37 years his junior.

Wolfe's final marriage was to Linda Taylor, who holds the record for the most-married woman (23 times). The marriage was a publicity stunt, and a week after the wedding, Taylor went back to her hometown in Indiana, but she kept her married name.

Wolfe died in Redlands, California, on June 10, 1997, 45 days before his 89th birthday. He had approximately 19 children. His body went unclaimed, and he was eventually buried in Blythe. None of the 28 women he legally married, and only one of his children, attended the funeral service.

Marriages 
Between 1926 and until his death in 1997, Wolfe married 29 different women. Some marriages remain unverified. However, according to the Guinness World Records, this list is accurate.

 Marcie McDonald (1926–1927; her death)
 Stephanie Delaney (1928–1930; divorced)
 Victoria Ernest (1931; divorced)
 Katherine Johnson (1932; divorced)
 Rachel Jennigs-Prescott (1932–1934; divorced)
 Charlotte Devane (1935–1936; divorced)
 Valerie Harborn (1936; divorced)
 Charlotte Devane (1936–1938; her death)
 Frances Hunter (1939; her death)
 Carol Demmings (1940–1944; divorced)
 Priscilla Ralph (1946–1947; divorced)
 Katherine Archer (1948; divorced)
 Lisa Waters (1948; divorced)
 Katherine Archer (1949–1951; divorced)
 Nina Morgan-Stuart (1954; divorced)
 Chase Jones (1955; divorced)
 Kathleen Briggs (1958; divorced)
 Sharon Goodwin (1958–1959; divorced)
 Sharon Goodwin (1960; divorced)
 Demerle Goin-Rankin (1964; divorced)
 Julia Santiago (1968; divorced)
 Gloria Mascari (1969; divorced)
 Vivan Alvers (1970–1973; her death)
 Maria Velez (1977–1980; divorced)
 Guadalupe Chavez (1979; divorced)
 Maria Chavez (1979–1982; divorced)
 Eileen Shelton (1982–1984; divorced)
 Christine Camacho (1984–1995; divorced)
 Bonny Lee Bakley (1995; annulled)
 Emily Salerno (1996; divorced)
 Linda Taylor (1996–1997; his death)

Death 
Wolfe died on June 10, 1997 in a Redlands, California nursing home of heart disease at the age of 88.

See also 
Tommy Manville

References 

People from Blythe, California
1908 births
1997 deaths
20th-century Baptist ministers from the United States